Petrovo is a rural locality (a village) in Beketovskoye Rural Settlement, Vozhegodsky District, Vologda Oblast, Russia. The population was 10 as of 2002.

Geography 
Petrovo is located 71 km southwest of Vozhega (the district's administrative centre) by road. Krapivino is the nearest rural locality.

References 

Rural localities in Vozhegodsky District